Japan competed at the 1976 Winter Olympics in Innsbruck, Austria.

Alpine skiing

Men

Biathlon

Men

 1 One minute added per close miss (a hit in the outer ring), two minutes added per complete miss.

Men's 4 x 7.5 km relay

 2 A penalty loop of 200 metres had to be skied per missed target.

Bobsleigh

Cross-country skiing

Men

Women

Figure skating

Men

Women

Ice hockey

First round
Winners (in bold) entered the Medal Round. Other teams played a consolation round for 7th-12th places.

|}

Consolation round

Romania 3-1 Japan
Austria 3-2 Japan
Japan 6-4 Switzerland
Japan 4-3 Yugoslavia
Japan 7-5 Bulgaria

Luge

Men

(Men's) Doubles

Women

Nordic combined 

Events:
 normal hill ski jumping 
 15 km cross-country skiing

Ski jumping

Speed skating

Men

Women

References
Official Olympic Reports
Japan Olympic Committee database
 Olympic Winter Games 1976, full results by sports-reference.com

Nations at the 1976 Winter Olympics
1976
Winter Olympics